Marika Gombitová (born September 12, 1956, in Turany nad Ondavou, Czechoslovakia) is a Slovak singer-songwriter who began her career as a female vocalist in the band Modus in the late 1970s.

Besides gaining fame for her subsequent solo career, she also became known as the victim of a single-vehicle collision on December 1, 1980, alleged to have been caused by reckless driving by Andrea B. Although she survived, Gombitová sustained irreparable injuries to her backbone and spinal cord and, as a result, is paralyzed from the 7th vertebral notch downwards, and was hence reliant on a wheelchair. After a six-month recovery, the physically disabled artist returned to the spotlight, achieving new top rankings on the music charts and even touring again.

Few details of the Gombitová's car crash and its subsequent investigation have been made public and, therefore, the circumstances of the issue remain the subject of controversy.

Crash

Background
On Sunday, November 30, 1980, Modus were to perform their final concert in the original setup, which featured Ján Lehotský, Miroslav Žbirka, Gombitová, Ladislav Lučenič and Dušan Hájek. The concert was planned to take place in the premises of a former club called ZK ROH Zbrojovka, located in Brno-Židenice, Czechoslovakia. Gombitová had called Lehotský earlier, complaining of feeling unwell and hoping to excuse herself from the event, but in spite of this, she joined the group as scheduled.

According to the Slovak newspaper Nový čas, which tried to reconstruct sequence of events in the new millennium, Žbirka confirmed that he had left the location in a Škoda 1000 MB along with Lučenič, and probably also with another person. Lehotský is reported to have been in his own car, accompanied by Hájek, and Gombitová was in a Renault 5 owned and driven by her 21-year-old friend known as Andrea B, reportedly from West Germany. The cars set out from Brno separately around midnight, taking different routes to Bratislava.

December 1, 1980
At approximately 1:00 am on December 1, 1980, the automobile carrying Gombitová went into a skid at the 43rd km of the recently opened D1 motorway, between Podivín and Břeclav. The vehicle spun around, made a few somersaults and ended up on its roof in a field. While the driver, Andrea B, was only slightly injured, the trapped artist had to be extricated from the wrecked car by the rescue crew, sustaining severe multiple injuries, including spinal cord injuries, fractured ribs, sternal fracture, broken backbone and a broken little finger.
Allegedly still conscious, Gombitová was rushed to the nearest hospital in Hustopeče, while Andrea B was interrogated by police patrol officers from the SNB.

Aftermath
Paralyzed from the 7th vertebral notch downwards, Gombitová lost function over two-thirds of her body, even losing the use of the lower part of her lungs. She was diagnosed with acute pneumonia and transported to the Slovak Hospital Kramáre in Bratislava. After four months spent mostly at the local neurosurgery department, she was taken in April 1981 to the Rehabilitation Institute of Kladruby, now in the Czech Republic. Her rehabilitation later continued in the German spa town Bad Wildungen and in Karlovy Vary. In 1982, Gombitová underwent major surgery in Moscow, but with no significant impact on her mobility.

Trial
The case was examined by the Highway patrol in Podivín, which shredded all available files and photographs after ten years, in accordance with internal regulations.

A judicial investigation reportedly concluded that the crash was caused by Andrea B, who lost control of the car at high speed. Andrea B was, therefore, convicted of assault causing bodily harm and sentenced to prison. However, it is not known whether she actually went to prison, as she immediately left the country. Newspapers report that, at the court, she defended herself for exceeding the speed limit by claiming that her visa was set to expire at midnight on Sunday, November 30, 1980.

Impact

Reactions
The Communist Party of Czechoslovakia (KSČ) imposed an embargo on the case on grounds of national interest. There was a delay of two days before the public was informed of the crash in an initial report in the daily newspaper Mladá fronta on December 3, 1980. The newspaper gave details confirming the critical condition of the singer and identified the driver of the vehicle as "21 years old Andrea B from West Germany", who would not adapt her speed to the snowy road surface. The article also reported that the Brno police had launched a prosecution against the "foreign citizen".

As all official reports had been discarded in the meantime, later mass media speculated that the crash could have been caused by reckless driving, drunk driving, or both. Although personally identifiable information related to Andrea B remains undisclosed, Nový čas described the driver as an attractive blonde, possibly working in the fashion industry, and said they could not guess where she had disappeared to. The Czech authors of Gombitová's 2008 biography, however, described Andrea B as "a receptionist at a luxury hotel, to which Gombitová was reportedly invited through the [art agency] Slovkoncert". Other sources, such as Modus band's sound engineer Andrej Andrašovan, referred to the Renault's driver as a native-born citizen of Switzerland whose car had a German registration plate. On the other hand, Milan Drobný, a fellow Czech singer, referred to Andrea B as "that Austrian or German."

Nočné lampy interview
In December 2000, Gombitová unexpectedly appeared in Nočné lampy ("Night Lamps"), a former late night talk show produced by CEM network Markíza. The  television program, hosted by Jarmila Hargašová (pictured right), invited celebrity guests who had been involved in extraordinary situations. Gombitová probably agreed to appear on the show because of the positive reception for her new song "Prosba" ("Appeal"), which had been preceded by a six-year absence. For the first time in twenty years since her crash, the singer talked about her life openly in front of television cameras. Her crucial collaborators were also present at the interview, such as Modus ex-members Ján Lehotský and Miroslav Žbirka, and her past songwriters Kamil Peteraj, Pavol Hammel and Marián Varga.

After a  introduction, during which Gombitová discussed her temporary comeback and rise to prominence, the conversation turned to her crash. When finally asked to recall that date, she responded with:

Lehotský did not comment on it. Žbirka confirmed that the weather was bad that day and highlighted the band's sense of professional responsibility to perform that evening. He eventually added "that highway had in fact been impassable." During the rest of the interview, Gombitová talked about the subsequent events that led to her hospitalization, rather than reconstructing the incident itself. Neither Andrea B nor the relationship between them was mentioned in any way in the publicly released version of the pre-filmed show. Hargašová said that she had visited Gombitová at home to discuss various topics in advance twice: the first time about one year before the talk show, and the second time one day prior to that. In an interview published in SME on May 18, 2001, host admitted that, shortly before filming the TV show, Gombitová asked her not to go public about the subjects they discussed in advance in private.

See also
 List of traffic collisions (1700–1999)
 List of awards and nominations received by Marika Gombitová
 Marika Gombitová discography

References

Bibliography

Further reading

External links

Marika Gombitová on Discogs

Car Accident
1980 in music
1980 in Czechoslovakia
1980 road incidents
Crime in Czechoslovakia
Czechoslovak victims of crime
Road incidents in the Czech Republic